The 2006 DFB-Pokal Final decided the winner of the 2005–06 DFB-Pokal, the 63rd season of Germany's premier knockout football cup competition. It was played on 29 April 2006 at the Olympiastadion in Berlin. Bayern Munich won the match 1–0 against Eintracht Frankfurt via a goal from Claudio Pizarro, giving them their 13th cup title.

Route to the final
The DFB-Pokal began with 64 teams in a single-elimination knockout cup competition. There were a total of five rounds leading up to the final. Teams were drawn against each other, and the winner after 90 minutes would advance. If still tied, 30 minutes of extra time was played. If the score was still level, a penalty shoot-out was used to determine the winner.

Note: In all results below, the score of the finalist is given first (H: home; A: away).

Match

Details

Notes

References

External links
 Match report at kicker.de 
 Match report at WorldFootball.net
 Match report at Fussballdaten.de 

Eintracht Frankfurt matches
FC Bayern Munich matches
2005–06 in German football cups
2006
April 2006 sports events in Europe
2006 in Berlin
Football competitions in Berlin